Iosco Township may refer to:

 Iosco Township, Michigan
 Iosco Township, Waseca County, Minnesota
 Iosco Township, Stutsman County, North Dakota, in Stutsman County, North Dakota

Township name disambiguation pages